Frederick or Fred Parker may refer to:
Frederick Parker (furniture manufacturer), British furniture manufacturer
Frederick Parker (cricketer) (1913–1988), English cricketer
Frederick Parker, a character in Angel on My Shoulder
Jack Parker (hurdler) (Frederick John Parker, 1927–2022), British hurdler
Chubby Parker (Frederick R. Parker, 1876–1940), American old-time and folk musician and early radio entertainer
Fred I. Parker (1938–2003), federal judge in the United States
Fred Parker (footballer, born 1893) (1893–?), English footballer
Fred Parker (footballer, born 1886) (1886–1963), English football forward and manager
Freddie Parker (born 1962), former running back in the National Football League
Fred Parker (ice hockey), former ice hockey coach
Fred Parker Jr. (born 1980), American actor

See also